Corpulentapus is an ichnogenus of Early Cretaceous theropod tracks uncovered at the Zhucheng tracksite in Shandong, China.

References

Dinosaur trace fossils